Maoming railway station (Chinese: 茂名站) is a railway station in Maonan District, Maoming, Guangdong, China.

History

The station was opened on 3 May 1991 along with the final section of the Guangzhou–Maoming railway.

The name of this station was changed from Maoming East to Maoming on 10 September 2016. Another station, previously called Maoming, was renamed Maoming West railway station at the same time.

On 21 October 2019, a new station building south of the railway was opened, while the old station building situated north of the line was closed. The north station building was subsequently demolished and a new building was opened on 8 January 2022.

References

Railway stations in Guangdong
Railway stations in China opened in 1991